The Circuito Urbano Bilbao was a  street circuit in Bilbao, Spain. It was used only once in 15–17 July 2005 for an event of the Formula Renault 3.5 Series, Eurocup Formula Renault 2.0 and Eurocup Mégane Trophy championships.

Winners

Lap records 

The official lap records at the Circuito Urbano Bilbao are listed as:

References 

 	

Bilbao
Bilbao
Sports venues in the Basque Country (autonomous community)
Sport in Bilbao